Sugartime is a 1995 American crime film directed by John N. Smith and written by Martyn Burke. It is based on the 1991 book Roemer: Man Against the Mob by William F. Roemer Jr. The film focuses on the true story of the affair between singer Phyllis McGuire of The McGuire Sisters, and Mafia boss Sam Giancana, famous for his alleged connections to John F. Kennedy and Frank Sinatra. It stars John Turturro, Mary-Louise Parker, Elias Koteas, Maury Chaykin, Louis Del Grande, Deborah Duchêne and Larissa Laskin. The film premiered on HBO on November 25, 1995.

Plot

Cast 

John Turturro as Sam Giancana
Mary-Louise Parker as Phyllis McGuire
Elias Koteas as Butch Blasi
Maury Chaykin as Tony Accardo
Louis Del Grande as Chuckie English
Deborah Duchêne as Christine McGuire
Larissa Laskin as Dorothy McGuire
Amanda Blitz as Annette Giancana
Renessa Blitz as Francine Giancana
Kelly Bodanis as Doris
Bob Clout as Mr. McGuire
Stuart Clow as Vince Inserra
Bill Cross as Robert Maheu
Reg Dreger as Wadden
Greg Ellwand as William F. Roemer Jr.
Ron Gabriel as Frederick Jones
Carole Galloway as Mrs. McGuire
Yamit Geiger as Bonnie Giancana
Sam Grana as Johnny Roselli
Howard Jerome as Russian Louie
Nahanni Johnstone as Carlene Delfano
Patrick Jude as Frank Sinatra
David Keeley as Ralph Hill
Deborah Kirshenbaum as Marie Perno 
John Kozak as Eddie Vogel
Peter Krantz as Robert F. Kennedy
Corinne Langston as Queen Mother
Adam Large as Fanning
John Lefebvre as Bennett Williams
Vincent Marino as Jimmy Perno
Robin McCulloch as Dick Martin
Gerry Mendicino as Libonati
Tony Munch as Moretti
Michael Rhoades as Schippers
Nicholas Rice as Judge Campbell
Rino Romano as Phil Alderisio
Tony Rosato as Frank Ferraro
Chuck Shamata as Michael Delfano
Ralph Small as John Bassett
Jonathan Whittaker as Dan Rowan

References

External links

 

1995 television films
1995 films
American crime films
1995 crime films
HBO Films films
Films directed by John N. Smith
Films about the American Mafia
Films about the Chicago Outfit
1990s English-language films
1990s American films